KLG is used to refer to

 Kalskag Airport, Alaska, US, IATA code
 KLG spark plug, invented by Kenelm Lee Guinness
 KLG (restaurant chain) in Taiwan and other countries